De Lier is a village in the Dutch province of South Holland. It is a part of the municipality of Westland, and lies about 5 km north of Maassluis.

The village of De Lier obtained its name from the name of an old river called .

De Lier used to be a separate municipality. On 26 March 1963 it was granted their coat of arms and on 14 April 1965, it adopted their modern-day flag. On 1 January 2004, it merged with Naaldwijk, 's-Gravenzande, Monster, and Wateringen to form the municipality of Westland. The former municipality covered an area of 8.93 square kilometres.

In 2001, De Lier had 9415 inhabitants. In 2003, De Lier had 11,400 inhabitants. The built-up area of the village was 2.2 km², and contained 3494 residences.
The statistical area "De Lier", which can also include the peripheral parts of the village as well as the surrounding countryside, has a population of around 11,470.

Nearby quarters

References

External links
 
 www.crwflags.com
 www.fallingrain.com

Municipalities of the Netherlands disestablished in 2004
Populated places in South Holland
Former municipalities of South Holland
Westland (municipality), Netherlands